The David Lloyd Club Turó is a sports club in Barcelona, Catalonia, Spain. The venue has been the host of the annual WTA tournament, the Barcelona Ladies Open in 2008, 2009 and 2010.

The facilities includes 12 tennis courts, 12 paddle courts, gym, 5 studios, outdoor swimming pool, indoor swimming pool and kids area.

It was founded in 1905 under the name «Lawn Tennis del Turó» which later changed to Reial Club Tennis del Turó. In 2003, the company David Lloyd Leisure took over the management of the club and hence the current name.

References

External links
Central Court 1
Central Court 2

Tennis venues in Catalonia
Tennis clubs in Spain
Sports venues in Barcelona